The Last Summer (translit. Posledno lyato) is a 1974 Bulgarian drama film directed by Christo Christov. It was selected as the Bulgarian entry for the Best Foreign Language Film at the 47th Academy Awards, but was not accepted as a nominee.

Cast
 Grigor Vachkov as Ivan Efreytorov
 Dimitar Ikonomov as Dinko
 Bogdan Spasov as Dyadoto
 Vesko Zehirev as Vuychoto
 Lili Metodieva as Maykata
 Daniela Danailova as Karakachankata
 Lyuben Boyadzhiev as Generalat
 Yuli Toshev as Majorat
 Peter Goranov as Partizaninat
 Dimitar Milanov as Dyavolat

See also
 List of submissions to the 47th Academy Awards for Best Foreign Language Film
 List of Bulgarian submissions for the Academy Award for Best Foreign Language Film

References

External links
 

1974 films
1970s Bulgarian-language films
1974 drama films
Films directed by Christo Christov
Bulgarian drama films